St Joseph and St Francis Xavier Church is a Roman Catholic Parish church in Richmond, North Yorkshire. It is situated between Newbiggin and Victoria Road to the south of Richmondshire Cricket Club. The church was built in 1868 and was designed by George Goldie. It was founded by the Society of Jesus and it is a Grade II listed building.

History

Foundation
In 1794, Fr Thomas Austin Lawson OSB from Downside Abbey came to Richmond to start a mission to the local Catholics of the area. After twenty years of serving the Catholic community, Lawson was recalled to the monastery in 1814 and died there that year.

The Jesuits took over the mission and sent Fr Robert Johnson SJ. He served the congregation for fifty years and died in 1865. In 1888,  a memorial window to him was installed in the church.

Construction
In 1866, he was succeeded by Fr William Strickland SJ who saw that the small chapel Lawson and Johnson had used was too small for the growing congregation. He asked the architect George Goldie to design a church that would accommodate the community.

In 1868, the church was completed and opened. However, the construction of the church and the nearby school, which became the parish hall, created a sizeable debt for the parish.

Administration
In 1961, a year before the Second Vatican Council, the Jesuits handed over the administration of the parish to the Diocese of Middlesbrough. The last Jesuit priest there was Fr Edmund Swift SJ. The diocese has continued to serve the parish ever since.

Parish

Mass times
St Joseph and St Francis Xavier Church has two Masses every Sunday, one at 18:30 on Saturday evening and the other at 09:30 on Sunday morning. There are also weekday Masses at 09:30 from Monday through to Saturday. At St Mary's Wycliffe, within the parish, there is a Sunday Mass at 11:30, and weekday communion services at 09:00 from Monday to Friday, with one at 10:00 on Saturdays.

St Mary's Church
The parish priest also serves St Mary's Church in Wycliffe, County Durham, situated close to Barnard Castle and Hutton Magna. It was built in 1848-49 as a chapel for Wycliffe Hall. The church is now part of a retreat centre, St Mary's Centre.

See also
 Society of Jesus

References

External links
 St Joseph and SFX Parish website
 St Mary's Centre, Wycliffe

Grade II listed churches in North Yorkshire
George Goldie church buildings
Roman Catholic churches in North Yorkshire
Roman Catholic churches completed in 1868
Grade II listed Roman Catholic churches in England
1868 establishments in England
Gothic Revival church buildings in England
Gothic Revival architecture in North Yorkshire
Richmond, North Yorkshire
19th-century Roman Catholic church buildings in the United Kingdom